Morchella septimelata is a species of fungus in the family Morchellaceae described as new to science in 2012.

Morchella septimelata is one of four species of wildfire-adapted morel in western North America, the others being M. capitata, M. sextelata, and M. tomentosa.  M. septimelata cannot be reliably distinguished from M. sextelata without the use of DNA analysis.  M. septimelata, identified as phylogenetic species "Mel-7", has also been found in Europe, Turkey, China, and Australia but it remains unclear whether dispersal between these distant locations occurred naturally or through accidental introduction by humans.

In 2014, Richard et al. clarified the taxonomic status of this species, retaining the name Morchella eximia Boudier (1909) over M. septimelata.

References

External links

Morchellaceae
Edible fungi
Fungi described in 2012
Fungi of North America